Inside Straight is a live album by jazz saxophonist Cannonball Adderley recorded at the Fantasy Studios in Berkeley, California in 1973 featuring performances by Adderley's Quintet with Nat Adderley, Hal Galper, Walter Booker and Roy McCurdy with guest percussionist King Errisson.

Reception
The Allmusic review by Scott Yanow awarded the album 3½ stars and states "After seven years with Capitol, Cannonball Adderley switched labels to Fantasy where he reunited with producer Orrin Keepnews and the quality of his music immediately improved". The Penguin Guide to Jazz awarded the album 3 stars stating "This was one of his live-in-the-studio sessions with a late edition of the band. Galper plays smart, probing electric piano and Booker and McCurdy generate considerable heat".

Track listing
All compositions by Julian "Cannonball" Adderley & Nat Adderley except as indicated
 Introduction by Bill Hall, KDIA (San Francisco) - 0:19
 "Inside Straight" - 3:19
 "Saudade" (Walter Booker) - 7:47
 "Inner Journey" (Hal Galper) - 8:28
 "Snakin' the Grass" (Galper) - 6:24
 "Five of a Kind" (Nat Adderley) - 5:27
 "Second Son" (Galper) - 6:26
 "The End" - 1:06
Recorded at Fantasy Studio A in Berkeley, California on June 4, 1973

Personnel
Cannonball Adderley - alto saxophone
Nat Adderley - cornet
Hal Galper - electric piano
Walter Booker - bass
Roy McCurdy - drums
King Errisson - percussion

References

Albums produced by Orrin Keepnews
1973 live albums
Cannonball Adderley live albums
Fantasy Records live albums
Nat Adderley live albums